Graniti is a comune (municipality) in the Province of Messina in the Italian region Sicily, located about  east of Palermo and about  southwest of Messina.

Graniti borders the following municipalities: Antillo, Castiglione di Sicilia, Gaggi, Mongiuffi Melia, Motta Camastra.

Demographic evolution

References

Cities and towns in Sicily